Frederick Fanning Backus (June 15, 1794 Bethlehem, Litchfield County, Connecticut – November 4, 1858 Rochester, Monroe County, New York) was an American physician and politician from New York.

Life
He was the son of Rev. Azel Backus D.D. (1765–1817?), the first President of Hamilton College, and Mellicent (Deming) Backus (1766–1853). He graduated from Yale College in 1813. Then he studied medicine with Dr. Eli Ives in New Haven, received a medical degree, and commenced the practice of medicine in Rochester in 1816. In 1818, he married Rebecca A. Fitzhugh (1791–1869), daughter of William Fitzhugh (1761–1839), one of the founders of Rochester, and they had five children.

He was a member of the New York State Senate (8th D.) from 1844 to 1847, sitting in the 67th, 68th, 69th and 70th New York State Legislature.

He was buried at the Mount Hope Cemetery, Rochester.

His sister Wealtha Ann Backus (1800–1819) was the first wife of Abolitionist Gerrit Smith (1797–1874). Canal Commissioner Henry Fitzhugh (1801–1866) was a brother of Backus's wife Rebecca and of Gerrit Smith's second wife, Ann Carroll Fitzhugh (1805–1879).

Notes

References
The New York Civil List compiled by Franklin Benjamin Hough (pages 134ff and 138; Weed, Parsons and Co., 1858)
Documents of the Assembly (1860; Vol IV, pg. 176ff, "Biographical Notice of Frederick Fanni Backus M.D.")

External links

1794 births
1858 deaths
New York (state) Whigs
19th-century American politicians
New York (state) state senators
People from Bethlehem, Connecticut
Politicians from Rochester, New York
19th-century American physicians
Burials at Mount Hope Cemetery (Rochester)
Physicians from Rochester, New York
Yale College alumni